Raumati South is a coastal community on the Kapiti Coast of New Zealand's North Island. It is 50km north-west of Wellington, and immediately south of Raumati Beach and south-west of Paraparaumu. The Maungakotukutuku area is located inland.

"Raumati" is the Māori language word for "summer".

In 1912, Herbert and William Eatwell had named the place Kawatiri, but the name was changed to the current one in 1934 because of another place with the same name in the Tasman Region.

To the south of the town, between it and the town of Paekakariki, is the Queen Elizabeth Park, a 638 hectare regional park used during the filming of The Lord of the Rings: The Return of the King, where it represented Pelennor Fields. Raumati South is known for the large number of its residents pursuing alternative lifestyles and artistic endeavors. The main primary education provider is Raumati South Primary School. There is also a Steiner school called 'Te Ra' located on Poplar Avenue.

Demographics

Raumati South had a population of 3,753 at the 2018 New Zealand census, an increase of 159 people (4.4%) since the 2013 census, and an increase of 207 people (5.8%) since the 2006 census. There were 1,416 households. There were 1,827 males and 1,923 females, giving a sex ratio of 0.95 males per female. The median age was 42.8 years (compared with 37.4 years nationally), with 828 people (22.1%) aged under 15 years, 504 (13.4%) aged 15 to 29, 1,914 (51.0%) aged 30 to 64, and 504 (13.4%) aged 65 or older.

Ethnicities were 91.4% European/Pākehā, 11.7% Māori, 3.7% Pacific peoples, 3.4% Asian, and 2.3% other ethnicities (totals add to more than 100% since people could identify with multiple ethnicities).

The proportion of people born overseas was 24.3%, compared with 27.1% nationally.

Although some people objected to giving their religion, 61.5% had no religion, 26.2% were Christian, 0.6% were Hindu, 0.2% were Muslim, 0.7% were Buddhist and 2.9% had other religions.

Of those at least 15 years old, 903 (30.9%) people had a bachelor or higher degree, and 297 (10.2%) people had no formal qualifications. The median income was $36,900, compared with $31,800 nationally. The employment status of those at least 15 was that 1,482 (50.7%) people were employed full-time, 474 (16.2%) were part-time, and 108 (3.7%) were unemployed.

Sports and parks 

Tennis courts were built by Bert Eatwell in Raumati South (then Kawatiri) in about 1930. The first tennis club in Raumati South was established in the mid-1940s. A bowling club was established in Raumati South in 1945 but is no longer operating. A surf club was established in Raumati South in 1955.

Education

References

External links 
Raumati South Home Page

Populated places in the Wellington Region
Kapiti Coast District